"Why seek ye the living?" is an anthem for four-part choir and organ by Charles Villiers Stanford, a setting of a passage from the Gospel of Luke, related to Easter.

History 
Stanford was organist at Trinity College, Cambridge, from 1873 to 1892. He composed his first oratorio, The Three Holy Children, in 1885 on a commission of the Birmingham Festival, where Charles Gounod's oratorio trilogy La rédemption (1862) had been performed successfully in 1882. Gounod's work contains the text from the Gospel of Luke, which Stanford later used, as an alto aria at the beginning of Part II.

During his time in Cambridge, Stanford wrote several anthems on texts from the New Testament, while psalm settings were more traditional. He composed the setting of  c. 1890. The topic of the anthem is given by the first line, "Why seek ye the living among the dead?" It was first published in 1890 in the Free Church Hymn Book. In 1993, it was included in Favourite anthem book. 7, Twenty-five anthems for SATB, edited by Anthea Smith and published by Kevin Mayhew. The anthem was included in the service of Choral Evensong for Easter Day at Crediton Parish Church in 2013.

Luke's account in chapters 23 and 24 is that women visit the site where the body of Jesus was laid after his death, but cannot find the body. Two "men in shining garments" (traditionally identified with angels) address them with the verses which Stanford set:

References

External links 
 

Compositions by Charles Villiers Stanford
Choral compositions
1890 compositions
Anthems
Compositions in D major
Anglican church music
British church music